Yelena Baltabayeva (born 5 November 1962) is a Kazakhstani athlete. She competed in the women's shot put at the 1996 Summer Olympics.

References

External links
 

1962 births
Living people
Athletes (track and field) at the 1996 Summer Olympics
Kazakhstani female shot putters
Olympic athletes of Kazakhstan
Place of birth missing (living people)